Michel Vaarten (born 17 January 1957) is a retired track cyclist and road bicycle racer from Belgium. He represented Belgium at the 1976 Summer Olympics in Montreal, Quebec, Canada, where he won silver medal in the 1.000m time trial behind East Germany's Klaus-Jürgen Grünke. Vaarten was a professional from 1979 to 1992. He won 12 national titles, one European title and one world title, mainly in track cycling. Vaarten is currently piloting a Derny bike in many Six Day Cycling events around Europe.

After his competitive career, he served as a pacemaker.

Teams
1979: Mini Flat-VDB (Belgium)
1980: Eurobouw (Belgium)
1981: Fangio-Sapeco-Mavic (Belgium)
1982: Amko Sport (Netherlands)
1983: Suntour (Belgium)
1984: Fangio-Ecoturbo (Belgium)
1984: Suntour (Belgium)
1985: Unknown
1986: Eurosteiger (Belgium)
1987: Schwinn-Icy Hot (United States)
1988: Wheaties-Schwinn (United States)
1989: Wheaties-Schwinn (United States)
1990: Sakae-3 Rensho (United States)
1991: Unknown
1992: Buysse Babyartikelen (Belgium)
1992: Enra (Belgium)
1992: EM (Belgium)

References

External links
 

1957 births
Living people
Belgian male cyclists
Cyclists at the 1976 Summer Olympics
Olympic cyclists of Belgium
Olympic silver medalists for Belgium
Sportspeople from Turnhout
Cyclists from Antwerp Province
Olympic medalists in cycling
UCI Track Cycling World Champions (men)
Medalists at the 1976 Summer Olympics
Belgian track cyclists
Pacemakers